Arkansas College may refer to:

 Arkansas College (1850), founded in Fayetteville and destroyed during the American Civil War
 Arkansas College, the original name of Lyon College in Batesville, founded in 1872